Gottfried von Haberler (July 20, 1900 – May 6, 1995) was an Austrian-American economist. He worked in particular on international trade. One of his major contributions was reformulating the Ricardian idea of comparative advantage in a neoclassical framework, abandoning the labor theory of value for an opportunity cost concept.

Early life

Haberler was born in Austria-Hungary in 1900, and was educated in the Austrian School of economics. In 1936 he moved to the United States, joining the economics department at Harvard University. There he worked alongside Joseph Schumpeter.

Academic Career and Views

Haberler's two major works were Theory of International Trade (1936) and Prosperity and Depression (1937).

He was President of the International Economic Association (1950–1953).

In 1957 the General Agreement on Tariffs and Trade commissioned a report on the terms of trade for primary commodities, and Haberler was appointed Chairman. The report found that there was a decline in the terms of trade for primary producers, since 1955 commodity prices were said to have fallen by 5%, while industrial prices rose by 6%. Haberler's report seems to echo the report written by Raúl Prebisch in 1949 as well as Hans Singer in 1950. However, when a second report by Prebischf or the United Nations Conference on Trade and Development (UNCTAD) came out in 1964, Haberler denounced it. His particular disagreement was with the idea that there was a systematic long-term (secular) decline in the terms of trade.

In 1971, Haberler left Harvard to become a resident scholar at the American Enterprise Institute.

Among other things, Haberler is credited with developing the theory of opportunity cost, which was pioneered by the Englishman John Stuart Mill (1806-1873) and the Austrian Friedrich von Wieser (1851-1926) further developed it. 

Haberler died from Parkinson's disease in 1995.

Major works 
 Der Sinn der Indexzahlen, 1927.
 "Irving Fisher's 'Theory of Interest'", 1931, QJE. 
 "Money and the Business Cycle", in Wright (ed.), Gold and Monetary Stabilization, 1932
 Der Internationale Handel, 1933.
 The Theory of International Trade, 1936.
 "Mr Keynes' Theory of the Multiplier", 1936, ZfN 
 Prosperity and Depression: A theoretical analysis of cyclical movements, 1937. (this is the 3rd edition pub. in 1946)
 "The General Theory After Ten Years", in Harris (ed.), The New Economics, 1947.
 "The Market for Foreign Exchange and the Stability of the Balance of Payments", 1949, Kyklos. 
 "Some Problems in the Pure Theory of International Trade", 1950, EJ. 
 "The Pigou Effect Once More", 1952, JPE. 
 "Sixteen Years Later", in Lekachman (ed.), Keynes's General Theory, 1963.
 "Integration and Growth of the World Economy in perspective", 1964, AER. 
 Money in the International Economy, 1965.
 Inflation: Its causes and cures, 1960.
 "Monetary and Fiscal Policy for Economic Stability and Growth", 1967, Il Politico.
 "Theoretical Reflections on the Trade of Socialist Countries", 1968, in Brown and Neuberger (eds.), International Trade and Central Planning.
 Incomes Policy and Inflation, 1971.
 Economic Growth and Stability, 1974.
 Two Essays on the Future of the International Monetary Order, 1974.
 The World Economy and the Great Depression, 1976.
 The Problem of Stagflation: Reflection on the Microfoundation of Macroeconomic Theory and Policy, 1985.
 Essays of Gottfried Haberler (ed. A. Koo), 1985.
 The Liberal Economic Order, (ed. A. Koo), 1993.

References

Further reading

External links 
  Biography of Haberler from mises.org
 

 Gottfried Haberler (in German) from the online-archive of the Österreichischen Mediathek

1900 births
1995 deaths
20th-century American economists
American libertarians
Austrian School economists
Neurological disease deaths in Washington, D.C.
Deaths from Parkinson's disease
Harvard University faculty
Libertarian economists
Fellows of the Econometric Society
Presidents of the American Economic Association
Austrian emigrants to the United States
Member of the Mont Pelerin Society